Herbert Henry Rodd (10 February 1889 – 24 June 1968) was an Australian rules footballer who played with Melbourne in the Victorian Football League (VFL).

Notes

External links 
 
 
 Herbert Rodd, at Demonwiki.

1889 births
Australian rules footballers from Victoria (Australia)
Melbourne Football Club players
1968 deaths